The 2007 Lockdown was a professional wrestling pay-per-view (PPV) event produced by Total Nonstop Action Wrestling, which took place on April 15, 2007 at the Family Arena in Saint Charles, Missouri. This was the second monthly pay-per-view, after Bound for Glory (2006), to be held outside Orlando, Florida. It was the third annual event under the Lockdown chronology. Eight professional wrestling matches were featured on the event's card. In the tradition of Lockdown events, every match took place inside a steel structure with six sides, known as Six Sides of Steel. It was the final TNA Wrestling pay-per-view event to officially feature National Wrestling Alliance championships (although the physical belts were used at the following Sacrifice event, the titles had been vacated by the NWA in the morning of the day of the event).

In October 2017, with the launch of the Global Wrestling Network, the event became available to stream on demand. It would later be available on Impact Plus in May 2019.

Results

Xscape match
1.

References

External links
2007 Lockdown Photos
TNAWrestling.com - the official website of Total Nonstop Action Wrestling
Results/Details at OWW

Impact Wrestling Lockdown
Events in St. Charles, Missouri
Professional wrestling in Missouri
2007 in Missouri
April 2007 events in the United States
2007 Total Nonstop Action Wrestling pay-per-view events